The Angolan Basketball League Regular Season MVP Award, for sponsorships reasons named the Unitel Basket Regular Season MVP, is an annual basketball award given out to the most valuable player of a given Angolan Basketball League regular season. It is not to be confused with the Angolan Basketball League MVP Award, which is given to the best player of the entire season – usually to a player of the champions.

Winners

Awards by player

References

Basketball most valuable player awards
Angolan Basketball League